The Baltic Marine Environment Protection Commission (Helsinki Commission, HELCOM) is an intergovernmental organization governing the Convention on the Protection of the Marine Environment of the Baltic Sea Area (Helsinki Convention). A regional sea convention and a platform for environmental policy making at the regional level, HELCOM works for the protection of the marine environment of the Baltic Sea. HELCOM consists of ten members – the nine Baltic Sea countries Denmark, Estonia, Finland, Germany, Latvia, Lithuania, Poland, Russia and Sweden, plus the European Union.

The Helsinki Convention was signed in 1974 by the Baltic Sea coastal countries to address the increasing environmental challenges from industrialisation and other human activities, and that were having a severe impact on the marine environment. The Helsinki Convention includes the protection of the Baltic Sea from all sources of pollution from land, air and sea. It also commits the signatories to take measures to conserve habitats and biological diversity and to ensure the sustainable use of marine resources. The Helsinki Convention was updated in 1992 to take into account the geopolitical changes and emerging environmental challenges in the region. The current version was ratified in 2000.

Contracting parties of HELCOM are:

 Denmark
 Estonia
 European Union
 Finland
 Germany
 Latvia
 Lithuania
 Poland
 Russia 
 Sweden

The HELCOM Secretariat is located in Helsinki, Finland.

Organization 
HELCOM is organized around regular ministerial meetings and meetings of the lead delegates (HOD - Head of Delegation) where binding decisions and recommendations are agreed. Preparatory work for these meetings take place within five permanent and three time limited working groups. Members of the groups are nominated by the contracting parties and observers from non-governmental organizations, such as Coalition Clean Baltic.

Permanent working groups 
Gear Group on the Implementation of the Ecosystem Approach
Maritime Maritime Working Group, reduction of pollution from ships
Pressure Working Group on Reduction of Pressures from the Baltic Sea Catchment Area
Response Response Working Group, coordination of response to pollution incidents
State & Conservation Working Group on the State of the Environment and Nature Conservation

Time-limited working groups 
Agri – Group on sustainable agricultural practices
Fish – Group on Ecosystem-based sustainable fisheries
HELCOM-VASAB MSP – Joint HELCOM-VASAB Maritime Spatial Planning Working Group

In addition, the working groups have formed a number of expert groups with nationally nominated members and observers for specialized tasks.

See also 
 Marine protected area
 OSPAR

References

External links
 HELCOM official website

Baltic organizations
Intergovernmental environmental organizations
Intergovernmental organizations established by treaty
1974 establishments in Finland